Minuscule 679 (in the Gregory-Aland numbering), ε 354 (von Soden), is a Greek minuscule manuscript of the New Testament, on parchment. Palaeographically it has been assigned to the 13th century. The manuscript has complex contents. Scrivener labelled it 530e.

Description 

The codex contains the text of the four Gospels, on 240 parchment leaves (size ). The text is written in one column per page, 25-26 lines per page.
The first four lines in Matthew, Mark, and Luke being in gold, with pictures of the four Evangelists and nineteen others.

The Ammonian Sections  are incomplete and irregular, without a references to the Eusebian Canons. It has marginal critical notes but no lectionary markings. It contains portraits of the Evangelists and some hagiographic miniatures.

Text 

The Greek text of the codex is a representative of the Byzantine text-type. Kurt Aland did not place it in any Category.

According to Wisse's Profile Method it represents textual family Πb in Luke 1, Luke 10, and Luke 20.

History 

Scrivener dated the manuscript to the 12th century; Gregory dated it to the 13th century. Currently the manuscript is dated by the INTF to the 13th century.

It was added to the list of New Testament manuscript by Scrivener (530) and Gregory (679). It was examined by Dean Burgon.

The manuscript as acquired along with seven other manuscripts (556, 676, 677, 678, 680, 681, and 682) by the late Sir Thomas Phillips, at Middle Hill in Worcestershire.

Currently the manuscript is housed at the J. Paul Getty Museum (Ludw. II 5 (Phillipps 3887)) in Malibu, California.

See also 

 List of New Testament minuscules
 Biblical manuscript
 Textual criticism

References

Further reading 

 

Greek New Testament minuscules
13th-century biblical manuscripts